Lawrence Samuel Wrightsman, Jr. (October 31, 1931 – July 28, 2019) was an American psychologist known for his research in social psychology and the psychology of law. He taught at the University of Kansas from 1976 until his retirement in 2008. He served as president of the Society for the Psychological Study of Social Issues (SPSSI) from 1976 to 1977 and of the Society for Personality and Social Psychology (SPSP) from 1977 to 1978. According to the SPSP, "The textbooks, articles, and addresses that Larry wrote helped create the field of psychology and law as we know it."

References

External links
Profile at Social Psychology Network

1931 births
2019 deaths
Southern Methodist University alumni
University of Minnesota alumni
Vanderbilt University faculty
University of Kansas faculty
American social psychologists
People from Houston